"Make Love Fuck War", also called "MKLVFKWR", is a song by electronica musician Moby and hip hop group Public Enemy. It was released as a single on July 2, 2004. The song is featured on Unity: The Official Athens 2004 Olympic Games Album and Public Enemy's album, New Whirl Odor. It was initially released as a protest to the 2003 Iraq War; the music video combines footage from 2002–2003 urban protests against the war with footage from previous concerts of both participants in the single.

The track was part of a wave of anti-war songs by popular artists in response to US action in Iraq and Afghanistan, revelations about the mistreatment of prisoners in Abu Ghraib and Guantanamo Bay, and the perception that domestic needs were being neglected due to the costs of war. Make Love Fuck War called for individual resistance, grassroots struggle, and "power to the people" in support of peace.

Track listing

Charts

References

External links 
 

Moby songs
Public Enemy (band) songs
Anti-war songs
2004 singles
2004 songs
Mute Records singles
Protests against the Iraq War
Songs written by Chuck D
Songs written by Flavor Flav
Songs written by Moby